Terry Johnson (March 14, 1935 – July 24, 2010) was an engineer and entrepreneur notable for his pioneering work on hard disk drives (HDD). Johnson's early career included engineering and management roles in magnetic recording at IBM (1964–70) and Memorex (1971–73). He then joined in the development of STC 8000 Super Disk, a high-end, rotary actuator HDD funded by StorageTek.

In 1980, he left StorageTek to found a startup, Miniscribe, a manufacturer of 5.25 inch HDDs. In 1985, he started another new company, CoData, that subsequently merged with Conner Peripherals in 1986. CoData's 3.5-inch drive became Conner's first product. In 1985, Johnson co-founded PrairieTek, the first maker of 2.5 inch drives. Terry Johnson died in the Northwest Territories, Canada, when his private aircraft crashed during his return from a canoe trip.

Background 
Terry Johnson was born in Ogden, Utah, on March 14, 1935. On graduating high-school, he signed up for four years with the US Navy as an electronics technician. Johnson earned a Bachelor's degree in electrical engineering from the University of Utah in 1961 and a Master's degree from the UC Berkeley in 1963. After graduating from UC Berkeley, he joined IBM in San Jose, California. Seven years later, he left IBM to work at Memorex.

After two years at Memorex, Johnson left Memorex to join startup Disk Systems, which was funded by tape storage manufacturer StorageTek to develop STK 8000 Super Disk which resulted in a number of inventions.

After StorageTek acquired the startup and produced the STC 8800 Super Disk Johnson and most of his Disk Systems colleagues relocated to Colorado. Over the next five years, he advanced to Director of Engineering at StorageTek. In 1980, Johnson left StorageTek and in May of that year, he attended the National Computer Conference (NCC) at Anaheim with Roy Applequist. Finis Conner had rented suites at a hotel at NCC to showcase the newly developed Shugart Technology's ST506 drive. During their discussion, Shugart encouraged Johnson to start his own company building a competitive product.

MiniScribe 
The new venture, MiniScribe, did not get off to a good start but the decision by John Squires to join formed a functioning technical team. To complement Squires, Johnson drew on Roy Applequist's expertise for the mechanical configuration of the drive; Applequist had remained in San Jose when Disk Systems relocated to Colorado.

The company had difficulties in persuading vendors to supply components until Johnson encouraged some New York-based Venture Capitalists to fund Miniscribe. A sales call at Tandy marked a turning point for MiniScribe. The executive who met with John Squires specified a disk drive that bore little resemblance to the MiniScribe prototype. When Squires returned to Colorado, Johnson gave him free rein to design exactly what Tandy wanted.

The Miniscribe 2 or 2012 was shipped with the IBM PC XT. IBM needed a second source to Seagate and Johnson's struggling private company was the only option. The IBM contract underpinned the IPO (Initial Product Offering) that raised sufficient capital to invest in building manufacturing capacity. Less than a year later, however, IBM cut back its orders and Miniscribe was suspended from trading. When trading resumed, the company's value had halved and Johnson decided to leave. Miniscribe continued to grow after Johnson left until it dissolved in the biggest scandal of the storage industry.

CoData (Conner Peripherals) 
A few months later in 1985, John Squires also left Miniscribe and the pair decided to form CoData and build a 3.5" disk drive. After Squires completed an initial design, Johnson seeking marketing experience contacted Finis Conner, co-founder of Seagate Technology.  Conner wanted control and as Johnson said, "Co-Data became Conner Peripherals and when Finis came in the front door ...I went out the back door." CoData and Conner Peripherals merged in 1986, and Squires' design of the Co-Data drive became their first product. Squire's design of the CP340 set a new high for integrated control over disk drive dynamics by microcode. Johnson held 7% of the Conner stock at the time it went public in 1988.

PrairieTek 
After leaving CoData, Terry Johnson persuaded Disk Systems cohort Jim Morehouse to join him in founding PrairieTek in 1986 to build a 2.5" drive, a new form factor  aimed at the emerging laptop market. Computer companies were pursuing smaller size, lower weight, and longer battery life. Established disk companies recognized the need for something smaller than the 3.5" disk drive and Johnson saw a niche for this new kind of disk drive.  Scaling down a 3.5" design was not sufficient for the laptop market where shock-resistance and low power consumption were important. The technical team at PrairieTek designed a drive that became a prototype for successive generations of disk drives. Ramp Load/Unload was a key feature of PrairieTek drives.

But being early to market with a good new design was not enough. According to "The Innovator's Dilemma": 

Demand for 2.5" drives rose but PrairieTek filed for bankruptcy in 1991. Johnson did not blame his competitors for the company's demise, but saw it as a failure to execute on his own part.

Retirement and death 
Johnson maintained a continuing interest in the data storage industry but did not start any more new ventures. An avid fisherman, Johnson died when piloting his plane back from a trip to Canada in 2010. He was survived by his wife of 48 years, Edeltraud, and his children and grandchildren.

References 

American businesspeople
1935 births
2010 deaths
Aviators killed in aviation accidents or incidents in Canada